The Coloane B Power Station (CCB) is a combined cycle gas-fired power station in Coloane, Macau, China. It is the latest power station in Macau.

History

Inauguration
The power station was formally inaugurated on 8 April 2003 in a ceremony attended by  Edmund Ho, the Chief Executive of Macau. Upon its launch, the power plant added 38% growth to Macau's total installed capacity of electricity generation.

Generation
The power station installed capacity makes up 29% of Macau's total installed capacity. In 2012, it generated 2% of total electricity production in Macau.

See also
 CEM (Macau)
 Electricity sector in Macau
 List of power stations in Macau

References

2002 establishments in Macau
Coloane
Energy infrastructure completed in 2002
Natural gas-fired power stations in China
Power stations in Macau